Hand of Death or Hands of Death may refer to:

Films
 Hand of Death (1949 film), an Italian drama film
 Hand of Death (1962 film), an American horror film
 Hand of Death (1976 film), a Hong Kong martial arts film
 Nurse Sherri, a 1978 American horror film also known as Hands of Death
 Unmasked Part 25, a 1988 British slasher film also known as Hand of Death
 Hands of Death (1988 Hong Kong film), a 1988 Hong Kong martial arts film also known as Ninja Operation 7: Royal Warriors

Other uses
 Hands of Death (Burn Baby Burn), a song by Rob Zombie and Alice Cooper